The Lawrence Textile Strikes were part of a series industrial strikes in the garment and textile industries of the American East from 1909 to 1913. The participants of these strikes were largely immigrant factory workers from southern and eastern Europe. Class division, race, gender, and manufacturing expertise all caused internal dissension among the striking parties and this led many reformist intellectuals in the Northeast to question their effectiveness. A major turning point for these labor movements occurred in 1912 during the Lawrence Textile Strike in Lawrence, Massachusetts, where laborers were able to successfully pressure mill owners to raise wages, later galvanizing support from left-leaning intellectual groups. In 1913 the Paterson Silk Strike also referred to as the Lawrence Textile Strike of 1913  took place in Paterson, New Jersey. This strike was a work stoppage involving silk mill worker.

Strikes

References

Labor disputes in the United States